The Khas Mahal served as the Mughal emperor's private residence in Delhi. The structure is located inside the Red Fort, which is a large defensive and governmental complex located inside the city.

It consists of three parts: the Chamber of Telling Beads (Viz-tasbih-khana), the sleeping chamber, (khwabgah) and the wardrobe (tosha-khana) or sitting room (baithak). The interior is decorated with carved white marble painted with colourful floral decorations. The ceiling was also partially gilded. The marble screen was carved with the scale of justice (Mizan-i-adal), and above it is a particularly important item of Mughal art. The scale used was a depiction of the emperor's justice.

The projecting tower to the east of the Khas Mahal is called the Octagonal Tower (Muthamman Burj). The emperor would address his subjects every morning in a ceremony called Jharokha Darshan.

Gallery

References

External links

Red Fort